Herbert Rollwage (24 September 1916 – 4 January 1980) was a German Luftwaffe military aviator and fighter ace during World War II. Depending on source, he is credited between 71 and 102 aerial victories achieved in 664 combat missions. This figure includes 11 aerial victories on the Eastern Front, and at least 61 victories over the Western Allies, including up to 44 four-engine heavy bombers.

Career
Rollwage was born on 24 September 1916 in Gielde, at the time in the Province of Hanover within the German Empire, present-day part of the Schladen-Werla municipality. He was the son of a shunter who joined the military service of the Luftwaffe as an Unteroffizier (non-commissioned officer) candidate in 1936. Following flight training, Rollwage was posted to 4. Staffel (4th squadron) of Jagdgeschwader 53 (JG 53—53rd Fighter Wing) in 1941 holding the rank of Feldwebel (platoon sergeant).

Operation Barbarossa
On 8 June 1941, the bulk of JG 53's air elements moved via Jever, in northern Germany, to Mannheim-Sandhofen. There the aircraft were given a maintenance overhaul prior to moving east.

On 8 August 1942, Rollwage claimed a Supermarine Spitfire fighter shot down. His opponent may have been the Canadian fighter pilot George Beurling who managed to land his damaged aircraft. On 10 July 1943, Rollwage was shot down and wounded in his Messerschmitt Bf 109 G-6 (Werknummer 18242—factory number) near San Pietro.

Rollwage was promoted to Leutnant (second lieutenant) on 1 May 1944. On 27 May, the United States Army Air Forces (USAAF) 3rd Bombardment Division sent 102 Boeing B-17 Flying Fortress bombers to Strasbourg and further 98 B-17 bombers to the marshalling yard at Karlsruhe. Defending against attack, Rollwage claimed a B-17 bomber and an escorting North American P-51 Mustang fighter shot down. On 15 August, Rollwage was appointed Staffelkapitän (squadron leader) of 5. Staffel of JG 53. He succeeded Oberleutnant Karl Paashaus who was transferred.

Summary of career

Aerial victory claims
According to Spick, Rollwage was credited with 102 aerial victories claimed in over 500 combat missions. Toliver and Constable also list him with 102 aerial victories, 11 on the Eastern Front, 20 in the Mediterranean theater and 71 on the Western Front, including 44 heavy bombers. Obermaier states that exact number of aerial victories remains unknown, likely to be in the range of 80 to 85, claimed in 664 combat missions. Mathews and Foreman, authors of Luftwaffe Aces — Biographies and Victory Claims, researched the German Federal Archives and found documentation for 66 aerial victory claims, plus six further unconfirmed claims. This number includes ten claims on the Eastern Front and 56 over the Western Allies, including ten four-engined bombers.

Victory claims were logged to a map-reference (PQ = Planquadrat), for example "PQ 15 Ost S/JA". These sectors were then subdivided into 36 smaller units to give a location area 3 × 4 km in size.

Awards
 Front Flying Clasp of the Luftwaffe
 Iron Cross (1939)
 2nd Class (5 July 1941)
 1st Class (16 September 1941)
 Wound Badge (1939)
 in Black
 in Silver
 Honour Goblet of the Luftwaffe on 10 August 1942 as Oberfeldwebel and pilot
 German Cross in Gold on 12 December 1942 as Oberfeldwebel in the 5./Jagdgeschwader 53
 Knight's Cross of the Iron Cross with Oak Leaves
 Knight's Cross on 6 April 1944 as Oberfeldwebel and pilot in the 3./Jagdgeschwader 53
 713th Oak Leaves on 24 January 1945 as Leutnant and Staffelkapitän of the 5./Jagdgeschwader 53

Notes

References

Citations

Bibliography

 
 
 
 
 
 
 
 
 
 
 
 
 
 
 
 
 
 
 
 
 
 
 
 
 
 

1916 births
1980 deaths
People from Wolfenbüttel (district)
Luftwaffe pilots
German World War II flying aces
Recipients of the Gold German Cross
Recipients of the Knight's Cross of the Iron Cross with Oak Leaves